Robert Frederick Jeffery (born 19 September 1953 in Goulbourn, New South Wales) was an Australian cricketer, who played for New South Wales and Tasmania. He was a left-handed all-rounder who bowled left-arm medium pace, he represented Tasmania from 1978 until 1982.

See also
 List of Tasmanian representative cricketers
 List of New South Wales representative cricketers

External links
Cricinfo Profile

1953 births
Living people
Australian cricketers
Tasmania cricketers
New South Wales cricketers
People from Goulburn
Cricketers from New South Wales